Ricardo Alex Parada Sáez (born January 2, 1985), is a Chilean former footballer who last played as a striker.

Career 
Ricardo Parada, also known by his nickname Pescadito (Little Fish), is a former footballer from the lower divisions of the Club Deportivo Universidad de Concepción, where he was always the top-scorer.

In 2003, he was sent to Ñublense, until the second half of 2004, having won the third division championship, when he returned to the Club Deportivo Universidad de Concepción. He scored 5 goals in the Clausura championship in 2007. In 2008, he was signed by the Lobos de la BUAP, a Mexican football club. In the second half of that year, he was signed by Provincial Osorno. Since then, he has played with Antofagasta, Curicó Unido, Deportes Puerto Montt, Deportes Copiapó and Naval.

National team 
Parada played for Chile at the 2005 FIFA U-20 World Cup, where they were eliminated in the first knockout round.

Honours 
Ñublense
 Tercera División:

References

External links
 
 

Living people
1985 births
People from Concepción Province, Chile
Chilean footballers
Chile under-20 international footballers
Chilean expatriate footballers
Ñublense footballers
Universidad de Concepción footballers
Lobos BUAP footballers
Provincial Osorno footballers
C.D. Antofagasta footballers
Curicó Unido footballers
Puerto Montt footballers
Deportes Copiapó footballers
Deportes Valdivia footballers
Naval de Talcahuano footballers
Tercera División de Chile players
Chilean Primera División players
Primera B de Chile players
Segunda División Profesional de Chile players
Ascenso MX players
Chilean expatriate sportspeople in Mexico
Expatriate footballers in Mexico
Association football forwards